The Sandhills Women's Open was a golf tournament on the LPGA Tour, played only in 1951. It was played at the Southern Pines Country Club in Pinehurst, North Carolina. Patty Berg won the event.

References

Former LPGA Tour events
Golf in North Carolina
Women's sports in North Carolina